"Summertime Healing" is a song by English group, Eusebe. The song was released as a single in 1995 from the forthcoming debut album, Tales From Mama's Yard . "Summertime Healing" peaked at number 32 on the British charts and 80 on the ARIA charts.

Track listing
 "Summertime Healing" (Radio Edit) - 4:01
 "Summertime Healing" (Album Version) - 5:16
 "Summertime Healing" (Delta B Boy Classic) - 4:51
 "Eusube Do" - 3:27

Charts

References

1995 singles
1995 songs